Kothavalasa–Kirandul line belongs to Waltair railway division of East Coast Railway zone from 2003 till Feb 2019 . It was under South Eastern Railway zone until 2003. Now some Part  of KK line till Araku railway Station will be coming under South Coast Railway zone and East Coast Railway after Gorapur Station. It passes through three states – Andhra Pradesh, Odisha and Chhattisgarh.

History
In 1960, Indian Railway took up three projects: the Kothavalasa–Araku–Koraput–Jeypore–Jagdalpur–Dantewara–Kirandaul line, the Jharsuguda–Sambalpur–Bargarh–Balangir–Titlagarh project and the Biramitrapur–Rourkela–Bimlagarh–Kiriburu project. All the three projects taken together were popularly known as the DBK Project or the Dandakaranya–Bolangir–Kiriburu project. The Kothavalasa–Kirandaul line was opened in 1966–67 under S E Railway with financial aid of Japan for transporting iron ore.

Geography
This line passes hill sections of Eastern Ghats through Araku Valley. The line has a total of 58 tunnels and 84 major bridges and each tunnel is as long as 520 metres.

Electrification
Electrification of the line was completed in four phases. Kirandul–Jagdalpur section was completed in 1980. Jagdalpur–Koraput section was completed in 1981. Koraput–Araku–Waltair section was completed in 1982. The Kothavalasa–Kirandul route was completely electrified by 1982.

Jurisdiction
The line has a length of ,out of which  lies in Andhra Pradesh up to Gorapur which will be joining South Coast Railway, rest of the line will remain in the Rayagada division of East Coast Railway  lies in Odisha up to Khadapa,  lies in Chhattisgarh up to Kirandul. The maximum route km being in Chhattisgarh and Andhra Pradesh with Odisha taking 3rd position. The Kothavalasa–Kirandul section is classified as a Group E-special class line in which  speed should be below 100 km/h.

Performance
This line is mainly used for freight purposes which is a huge profit benefitting Waltair Division. Nearly  of profit comes through this line. Iron ore from Bailadila are transported to Visakhapatnam through this line.

References

External links

Rail transport in Andhra Pradesh
5 ft 6 in gauge railways in India
Railway lines opened in 1966

Rail transport in Odisha
Rail transport in Chhattisgarh
1966 establishments in India